Novokokhanovskoye is a rural locality (a selo) and the administrative centre of Novokokhanovsky Selsoviet, Kizlyarsky District, Republic of Dagestan, Russia. The population was 845 as of 2010. There are 6 streets.

Geography 
Novokokhanovskoye is located 9 km northwest of Kizlyar (the district's administrative centre) by road. Krasny Voskhod, Krasnooktyabrskoye and Novomonastyrskoye are the nearest rural localities.

Nationalities 
Dargins, Avars, Russians, Lezgins and Laks live there.

References 

Rural localities in Kizlyarsky District